The Hồ Chí Minh Prize is an honorary award given by the government of Vietnam in recognition of cultural and/or scientific achievement. The prize was established by decree in 1981, and has been awarded in 1996, 2000, 2005 and 2012, often posthumously. The prize is named for Ho Chi Minh, who was Chairman and founder of the Workers' Party of Vietnam, that is considered one of the highest honors bestowed by Vietnam.

Recipients

1996

Social sciences
 Nguyễn Khánh Toàn (vi)
 Trần Huy Liệu (vi)
 Đặng Thai Mai (vi)
 Trần Văn Giàu (vi)
 Vũ Khiêu (vi)
 Cao Xuân Huy (vi)
 Hồ Tôn Trinh (vi)
 Đinh Gia Khánh (vi)

Medicine
 Hồ Đắc Di (vi)
 Nguyễn Văn Hưởng (vi)
 Đặng Vũ Hỷ (vi)
 Phạm Ngọc Thạch (vi)
 Tôn Thất Tùng (vi)
 Đỗ Xuân Hợp (vi)
 Đặng Văn Ngữ
 Đặng Văn Chung
 Trần Hữu Tước (vi)
 Nguyễn Xuân Nguyên (vi)
 Trương Công Quyền (vi)
 Đỗ Tất Lợi (vi)
 Hoàng Tích Mịnh

Natural sciences and engineering
 Military Institute of Engineering
 Trần Đại Nghĩa (vi)
 Tạ Quang Bửu (vi)
 Nguyễn Xiển (vi)
 Lê Văn Thiêm, math
 Hoàng Tuỵ, math
 Đào Văn Tiến (vi)
 Nguyễn Văn Hiệu (vi)

Agriculture
 Lương Định Của (vi)
 Bùi Huy Đáp (vi)

Literature
 Nam Cao
 Huy Cận
 Xuân Diệu
 Tố Hữu
 Nguyên Hồng (vi)
 Nguyễn Công Hoan (vi)
 Nguyễn Tuân
 Nguyễn Đình Thi
 Ngô Tất Tố (vi)
 Chế Lan Viên (vi)
 Hải Triều (vi)
 Nguyễn Huy Tưởng (vi)
 Tế Hanh (vi)
 Tô Hoài (vi)

Fine arts
 Tô Ngọc Vân (vi) 
 Nguyễn Sáng (vi)
 Nguyễn Tư Nghiêm (vi)
 Trần Văn Cẩn (vi)
 Bùi Xuân Phái
 Nguyễn Đỗ Cung (vi)
 Nguyễn Phan Chánh (vi)
 Diệp Minh Châu (vi)

Photography
 Lâm Hồng Long (vi)
 Vũ Năng An (vi)
 Võ An Ninh (vi)
 Nguyễn Bá Khoản (vi)

Theatre
 Học Phi (Chu Văn Tập) (vi)
 Trần Hữu Trang (vi)
 Tống Phước Phổ (vi)
 Đào Hồng Cẩm (Cao Mạnh Tùng) (vi)
 Tào Mạt (Nguyễn Duy Thục) (vi)

Folk Arts
 Vũ Ngọc Phan (vi)
 Nguyễn Đổng Chi (vi)
 Cao Huy Đỉnh (vi)

Music
 Đỗ Nhuận
 Lưu Hữu Phước
 Văn Cao
 Hoàng Việt
 Nguyễn Xuân Khoát

Dance
 Nguyễn Đình Thái Ly (vi)

Film
 Nguyễn Hồng Sến (vi)

Architecture
 Nguyễn Cao Luyện (vi)
 Hoàng Như Tiếp
 Huỳnh Tấn Phát

2000

Sciences
 Various awards
Literature
 Bùi Đức Ái (Anh Đức) (vi)
 Nguyễn Minh Châu (vi)
 Nguyễn Khải (vi)
 Nguyễn Bính (vi)
 Nguyễn Văn Bổng (vi)
 Lưu Trọng Lư
 Nguyễn Quang Sáng (Nguyễn Sáng) (vi)
 Hoài Thanh (vi)
 Nguyễn Thi (Nguyễn Ngọc Tấn) (vi)
 Lê Khâm (Phan Tứ) (vi)
 Nông Quốc Chấn (vi)
 Trần Đình Đắc (Chính Hữu) (vi)
 Hồ Trọng Hiếu (Tú Mỡ) (vi)
 Hà Nghệ (Hà Xuân Trường) (vi)
 Nguyễn Đức Từ Chi (vi)

Fine Arts
 Nguyễn Tiến Chung
 Huỳnh Văn Gấm
 Dương Bích Liên (vi)
 Hoàng Tích Chù (vi)
 Nguyễn Văn Tỵ (vi)
 Nguyễn Hải
 Nguyễn Khang (vi)
 Nguyễn Sỹ Ngọc
 Nguyễn Thị Kim (vi)
 Lê Quốc Lộc

Photography
 Đinh Đăng Định (vi)

Theatre
 Thế Lữ (vi)
 Lộng Chương (vi)
 Lưu Quang Vũ (vi)

Music
 Huy Du
 Xuân Hồng
 Phan Huỳnh Điểu 
 Nguyễn Văn Tý
 Nguyễn Đức Toàn
 Hoàng Vân
 Nguyễn Văn Thương
 Hoàng Hiệp
 Trần Hoàn

2005

Sciences
 Khoa học xã hội (2 giải)[sửa]
Literature
 Anh Thơ (writer) (vi)
Theatre
 Nguyễn Đình Quang (vi)
Film
 Đặng Nhật Minh
 Nguyễn Hải Ninh
 Bùi Đình Hạc (vi)

2012

Social sciences
 Trần Quốc Vượng (vi)
 Hà Minh Đức (vi)
 Lê Trí Viễn (vi)
 Bùi Văn Ba

Natural Sciences
 49 prizes shared
 Lê Bá Thảo
 Nguyễn Tăng Cường (vi)
 Trần Quang Ngọc

Medicine
 8 prizes shared

Music
 Văn Chung
 Phạm Tuyên

Theatre
 Nguyễn Đình Nghi  (vi)
 Dương Ngọc Đức
 Sỹ Tiến

Literature
 Phạm Tiến Duật (vi)
 Hoàng Tích Chỉ (vi)
 Ma Văn Kháng (vi)
 Hữu Thỉnh (vi)
 Hồ Phương (vi)
 Đỗ Chu (vi)
 Lê Văn Thảo (vi)

See also 

 List of general science and technology awards

References

Orders, decorations, and medals of Vietnam
Awards established in 1981
1981 establishments in Vietnam

Science and technology in Vietnam
Vietnamese science and technology awards